Petrus Hofstede de Groot (8 October 1802 - 5 December 1886), Dutch theologian, was born at Leer in East Friesland, and was educated at the Gymnasium and University of Groningen.

For three years (1826-1829) he was pastor of the Reformed Church at Ulrum, and then entered upon his lifelong duties as professor of theology at Groningen. With his colleagues Louis Gerlach Pareau, Johan Frederik van Oordt, and Willem Muurling, he edited from 1837 to 1872 the Waarheid in Liefde. In this review and in his numerous books he vigorously upheld the orthodox faith against the Dutch "modern theology" movement. He became professor emeritus in 1872, and died at Groningen on 5 December 1886.


Published works

Latin 
 
 
  Second edition: 1839, third edition: 1845, fourth edition: 1861.
  Second edition: 1844, Third edition: 1851.
 
  Second edition: 1845, Third edition: 1848.

Dutch 
 
 
  (3 volumes) 1847, Volume 2, first edition, 1849, including additions and improvements from the second edition for the owners of the first, 1849, Volume 2, second edition 
 
 
 
 
  Republished as

References

Further reading 
  https://archive.org/details/MN41800ucmf_10/ https://archive.org/details/degroningergodg00groogoog/

1802 births
1886 deaths
Dutch Calvinist and Reformed theologians
19th-century Calvinist and Reformed theologians
People from Leer
University of Groningen alumni
Academic staff of the University of Groningen